Payathonzu ((Payathonzu Myo) is a town in the Karen State of south Myanmar, close to the border with Thailand.  It is separated from the Thai border township of Nong Lu by the Three Pagodas Pass. It is also the administrative seat of Hpayarthonezu Sub-township (fourth-level administrative division of Myanmar) in Kyain Seikgyi Township, Kawkareik District of Kayin State in Myanmar.

Overview
Payathonzu is home to Karen and Mon people. Separatist armies have been active in the town. Since 1990, it is under control of the Myanmar Army, however there is still occasional fighting in the area.

The Tai Ta Ya monastery is located in the town, and features a long row of statues.

Payathonzu can be accessed from the Thai side via the Three Pagodas Pass. The border may not be open to foreign visitors.

Camp Paya Thanzu Taung
Camp Paya Thanzu Taung (also Kilo 108)) was a prisoner of war camp during World War II on the Burma Railway. It was located about 500 metres north of the border. The first prisoners arrived in March 1943, and were mainly Dutch. Later, they were joined by British and Australian prisoners. The conditions were really bad with barely any food resulting in many deaths. After September 1943, the camp was used for maintenance of the rail road. The camp was abandoned in March 1944.

References

External links
 
 

Populated places in Kayin State
Burma Railway
Myanmar–Thailand border crossings